Lloyd's List is one of the world's oldest continuously running journals, having provided weekly shipping news in London as early as 1734. It was published daily until 2013 (when the final print issue, number 60,850, was published), and is in constantly updated digital format only since then.

Also known simply as The List, it was begun by Edward Lloyd, the proprietor of Lloyd's Coffee House, as a reliable and concise source of information for the merchants' agents and insurance underwriters who met regularly in his establishment in Lombard Street to negotiate insurance coverage for trading vessels. The digital version, updated hour-to-hour and used internationally, continues to fulfil a similar purpose. Today it covers information, analysis and knowledge relevant to the shipping industry, including marine insurance, offshore energy, logistics, market data, research, global trade and law, in addition to shipping news.

History
Predecessor publications are known. One historian, Michael Palmer, wrote that: "No later than January 1692, Lloyd began publishing a weekly newsletter, ‘Ships Arrived at and Departed from several Ports of England, as I have Account of them in London... [and] An Account of what English Shipping and Foreign Ships for England, I hear of in Foreign Ports’". However, claims that Lloyd's List is the oldest continuously published newspaper in the world are disputed. The World Association of Newspapers lists several earlier, extant titles.

Research on the history of Edward Lloyd, the founder of the coffee house, was carried out by Charles Wright and C. Ernest Fayle, authors of A History of Lloyd's, published in 1928 and cited by classification society Lloyd's Register.

The coffee house is first mentioned in 1689 in the London Gazette, when it was based in Tower Street. In 1691, Lloyd moved the premises to Lombard Street, close to the Royal Exchange at the heart of London’s trading activity. It became popular with merchants involved with the shipping industry, attracting a crowd that came regularly for news and gossip that Lloyd collected for clients. Lloyd’s News was published three times a week with no particular emphasis on shipping from 1696 to 1697. However, news continued to be read aloud at the coffee house.
 
In 1713 Lloyd died, leaving the lease of his coffee house to his son-in-law and head waiter William Newton. Newton died the following year, and Edward Lloyd's daughter Handy re-married to Samuel Sheppard. She died in 1720, leaving no Lloyd family member connected to the coffee house. Sheppard died in 1727, leaving it to his sister Elizabeth and her husband, Thomas Jemson. Jemson founded the Lloyd's List that is known today, when he launched a weekly shipping intelligence publication.  Publication was weekly until March 1735, then twice weekly, on Tuesdays and Fridays, according to Palmer.
 
By the 1760s the coffee house was reported to have acquired a bad reputation. One of the waiters secured new premises in Pope's Head Alley and from there in 1769, the New Lloyd’s List began, according to Lloyd's Register. The paper was published every day except Sundays from 1 July 1837. In July 1884 Lloyd's List merged with the Shipping and Mercantile Gazette.

Lloyd's List has spawned several spin-off titles, including sister title Insurance Day, owned by Informa plc.

In 2009, Lloyd's List went through a major re-design that encompassed both the masthead and the newspaper itself.

In 2011, a Lloyd’s List app was launched in the Apple iTunes store. In 2012, Containerisation International was included on Lloyd's List.

From 20 December 2013, Lloyd's List was published in digital format only, as it was found that fewer than 2% of customers used the print version.

In April 2017 the app was decommissioned from services; developers made the online portal mobile-friendly.

In 2022, Informa sold Lloyd's List to Montagu Private Equity.

References

Further reading
 Cameron, Alan, and Roy Farndon. Scenes from sea and city: Lloyd's list 1734-1984 (Lloyd's List, 1984), 250th. special anniversary supplement.
 McCusker, John J. "The Early History of ‘Lloyd's List’." Historical Research 64#155 (1991): 427-431.

External links

Official website
Michael Palmer's Lloyd's List history page
Lloyd's List 1741-1826

Magazines published in England
Water transport in England
Newspapers published in London
Publications established in 1734
1734 establishments in England
History of insurance